Carlquistia is a rare North American genus of flowering plants in the family Asteraceae containing the single species Carlquistia muirii. Formerly named Raillardiopsis muirii, the plant was reexamined in the 1990s and moved to a new genus of its own, separate from similar and closely related genera, such as Madia.  Common names for the species include Muir's tarplant, Muir's raillardiopsis, and Muir's raillardella.

This plant is related to the silversword alliance of Hawaiian plants.

The genus was named for the American botanist Sherwin Carlquist (1930-2021). The specific epithet "muirii" honors Scottish-American naturalist, John Muir (1838-1914).

Description
Carlquistia muirii is a rhizomatous perennial herb forming clumps or mats of stems with hairy green pointed leaves up to about 4 centimeters long. Leaves are arranged oppositely on the lower stem, and alternately higher up. The inflorescence is usually made up of a solitary glandular flower head on an erect stalk. The head contains many yellow disc florets but no ray florets. The fruit is a very narrow achene which may exceed one centimeter in length including its pappus of plumelike bristles.

Distribution
Carlquistia muirii is endemic to California. It has a discontinuous distribution, occurring in the southern Sierra Nevada (Fresno, Tulare, and Kern Counties) and on the other western side of the San Joaquin Valley around the Ventana Double Cone in the Santa Lucia Mountains of Monterey County.

References

External links
Carlquistia muirii. United States Department of Agriculture plants profile
Carlquistia muirii. CalPhotos photo gallery, University of California.

Monotypic Asteraceae genera
Endemic flora of California
Flora of the Sierra Nevada (United States)
Madieae